North Eastern Warriors is a badminton team representing Guwahati, Assam owned by The Eastern Warriors Pvt. Ltd. for the Premier Badminton League (PBL). The team's home ground is Karmabir Nabin Chandra Bordoloi Indoor Stadium, Guwahati. The team is coached by Indonesian coach Edwin Iriawan.

Current squad

Coach 

  Edwin Iriawan

Indian players

Foreign players

References

External links 

 Team profile

Premier Badminton League teams
Sport in Guwahati